The 1963 Humboldt State Lumberjacks football team represented Humboldt State College during the 1963 NCAA College Division football season. Humboldt State competed in the Far Western Conference (FWC).

The 1963 Lumberjacks were led by head coach Phil Sarboe in his 13th year at the helm. They played home games at the Redwood Bowl in Arcata, California. Humboldt State finished in a three-way tie for the conference championship, with a record of six wins, one loss and two ties (6–1–2, 3–1–1 FWC). The Lumberjacks outscored their opponents 138–54 for the season, which included five shutouts.

Schedule

Notes

References

Humboldt State
Humboldt State Lumberjacks football seasons
Northern California Athletic Conference football champion seasons
Humboldt State Lumberjacks football